Detective Gui is a 2015 suspense romantic comedy film directed by Oxide Pang. A China-Hong Kong-Taiwan co-production, the film was released in China on August 13, 2015.

Cast
Wang Luodan
Vic Chou
Simon Yam
Paw Hee-ching
Tien Hsin
Shek Sau
Maggie Shiu

Reception

Box office
The film earned  at the Chinese box office.

References

External links

2015 romantic comedy films
Chinese romantic comedy films
Films directed by Oxide Pang
Hong Kong romantic comedy films
Taiwanese romantic comedy films
2010s Hong Kong films